Siddharth "Siddhu" Jonnalagadda is an Indian actor, screenwriter, playback singer and editor who works in Telugu cinema. He debuted in a lead role with the film Life Before Wedding (2011). Jonnalagadda went onto to co-write and star in films such as Guntur Talkies (2016), Krishna and His Leela (2020), Maa Vintha Gaadha Vinuma (2020) and  DJ Tillu (2022).DJ Tillu 2 2023

Early life 
Siddhu Jonnalagadda was born and brought up in Hyderabad. He pursued MBA before venturing into a career in films.

Career 
Jonnalagadda made his lead debut with Praveen Sattaru's LBW: Life Before Wedding and then in between he did a Tamil film Vallinam (2014), and Ice Cream 2 (2014) before playing the lead role in Sattaru's Guntur Talkies (2016). Siddu plays the lead role in Krishna and His Leela, a romantic drama film starring Shraddha Srinath, Shalini Vadnikatti and Seerat Kapoor. In a review of the film by The Times of India, the reviewer wrote that "Siddhu is an absolute delight and a revelation in this one. ... The key to his character lies in being effortless and he plays it well". He will reprise the role of Rajkummar Rao in That Is Mahalakshmi, the Telugu remake of Queen.

Filmography

Films

All films are in Telugu, unless otherwise noted.

Television

Discography

References

External links 

Living people
Male actors in Telugu cinema
Male actors in Tamil cinema
Indian male film actors
21st-century Indian male actors
Year of birth missing (living people)
21st-century Indian singers
Telugu playback singers
Telugu screenwriters
Telugu male actors
Indian male playback singers
Male actors from Hyderabad, India
Screenwriters from Hyderabad, India